The following is a list of business schools in Australia organised by state.

New South Wales
 Australian Catholic University Faculty of Arts and Sciences (Schools of Business) - Australian Catholic University
 AIM Business School - Australian Institute of Management Education and Training
 Australian Graduate School of Management - University of New South Wales (postgraduate)
 UNSW Business School - University of New South Wales
 Charles Sturt University Faculty of Business - Charles Sturt University
 International College of Management, Sydney
 Le Cordon Bleu, Sydney
 Kaplan Business School, Sydney
 Macleay College, Sydney
 Macquarie Graduate School of Management - Macquarie University (postgraduate)
 Macquarie University Faculty of Business and Economics - Macquarie University
 Newcastle Graduate School of Business - University of Newcastle (postgraduate)
 S P Jain School of Global Management, Sydney
 Southern Cross Business School - Southern Cross University
 Sydney Business School - University of Wollongong (postgraduate)
 Sydney International School of Technology and Commerce
 University of New England Faculty of the Professions (School of Business, Economics and Public Policy) - University of New England
 University of Newcastle Faculty of Business and Law - University of Newcastle
 University of Sydney Business School - University of Sydney
 UTS Business School - University of Technology, Sydney
 Sydney Graduate School of Management - Western Sydney University (postgraduate)
Western Sydney University School of Business - Western Sydney University

 University of Wollongong Faculty of Commerce - University of Wollongong

Victoria
 AIM Business School - Australian Institute of Management Education and Training
 Australian Catholic University Faculty of Arts & Sciences (Schools of Business) - Australian Catholic University
 Australian Graduate School of Entrepreneurship - Swinburne University (postgraduate)
 Charles Sturt University Study Centres - Charles Sturt University (undergraduate and postgraduate)
 Chifley Business School - Chifley Business School (postgraduate)
 Deakin Business School - Deakin University (postgraduate)
 Deakin University Faculty of Business and Law - Deakin University
 Kaplan Business School, Melbourne
 La Trobe University Faculty of Law and Management (School of Business) - La Trobe University
 Le Cordon Bleu, Melbourne
 Macleay College, Melbourne
 Melbourne Business School - University of Melbourne (postgraduate)
 Monash Faculty of Business and Economics - Monash University
 Monash Graduate School of Business - Monash University (postgraduate)
 RMIT University College of Business - RMIT University
 Swinburne Business School - Swinburne University
 University of Ballarat School of Business - University of Ballarat
 Victoria Graduate School of Business - Victoria University (postgraduate)
 Victoria University Faculty of Business and Law - Victoria University

Queensland
 AIM Business School - Australian Institute of Management Education and Training
 Australian Catholic University Faculty of Arts & Sciences (Schools of Business) - Australian Catholic University
 Bond University Faculty of Business, Technology and Sustainable Development - Bond University
 Bond University School of Business - Bond University (postgraduate)
 Brisbane Graduate School of Business - Queensland University of Technology (postgraduate)
 Central Queensland University Faculty of Business and Informatics - Central Queensland University
 Griffith Business School - Griffith University (postgraduate)
 Griffith University Faculty of Business - Griffith University
 James Cook University Faculty of Law, Business and the Creative Arts - James Cook University
 James Cook University School of Business - James Cook University (postgraduate)
 Kaplan Business School, Brisbane
 Le Cordon Bleu, Brisbane
 Queensland University of Technology Faculty of Business - Queensland University of Technology
 Rhodes Business School (Australia) - Rhodes Business School (Australia)
 Southern Cross University Business School - Southern Cross University
 University of Queensland Faculty of Business, Economics & Law - University of Queensland
 University of Southern Queensland Faculty of Business - University of Southern Queensland
 University of the Sunshine Coast Faculty of Business - University of the Sunshine Coast
 University of the Sunshine Coast School of Management - University of the Sunshine Coast (postgraduate)
 UQ Business School - University of Queensland (postgraduate)
 USQ Australian Graduate School of Business - University of Southern Queensland (postgraduate)

Western Australia
 AIM Business School - Australian Institute of Management Education and Training
 Curtin Business School - Curtin University of Technology
 Edith Cowan University Faculty of Business and Law - Edith Cowan University
 Murdoch Business School - Murdoch University (postgraduate)
 Murdoch University Faculty of Law and Business - Murdoch University
 Perth Graduate School of Business- Edith Cowan University (postgraduate)
 University of Notre Dame Business School - University of Notre Dame
 UWA Business School - University of Western Australia

South Australia
 AIB Business School - Australian Institute of Business
 AIM Business School - Australian Institute of Management Education and Training
 Flinders Business - Flinders University (postgraduate)
 Flinders University College of Business, Government and Law - Flinders University
 International Graduate School of Business - University of South Australia (postgraduate)
 International Institute of Business and Information Technology , Federation University Australia
 Kaplan Business School, Adelaide
 Le Cordon Bleu, Adelaide
 University of Adelaide Business School - University of Adelaide (postgraduate)
 University of Adelaide Faculty of the Professions - University of Adelaide
 University of South Australia Division of Business - University of South Australia

Tasmania
 AIM Business School - Australian Institute of Management Education and Training
 Tasmanian School of Business and Economics - University of Tasmania
 University of Tasmania Graduate School of Management - University of Tasmania (postgraduate)

Australian Capital Territory
 AIM Business School - Australian Institute of Management Education and Training
 ANU College of Business and Economics - Australian National University
 National Graduate School of Management - Australian National University (postgraduate)
 University of Canberra Faculty of Business and Government - University of Canberra
 University of Canberra School of Business and Government - University of Canberra (postgraduate)

Northern Territory
 AIM Business School - Australian Institute of Management Education and Training
 Charles Darwin University Faculty of Law, Business and Arts - Charles Darwin University
 Charles Darwin University School of Law and Business - Charles Darwin University (postgraduate)

See also 
Lists of business school, other continents
 List of business schools in Africa
 List of business schools in Asia
 List of business schools in Europe
 List of business schools in the United States

 
Australia